Konstantin Nikolayevich Kaynov (born 2 May 1977) is a Russian professional football official and a former player. He works as a director with FC Chayka Peschanokopskoye.

Playing career
He made his debut in the Russian Premier League in 1999 for FC Krylia Sovetov Samara. Kaynov played for Levski Sofia in the A PFG during the 2000/2001 season.

Personal life
His son Maksim Kaynov is a professional footballer.

References

1977 births
Sportspeople from Nizhny Novgorod
Living people
Russian footballers
Russian expatriate footballers
Expatriate footballers in Bulgaria
PFC Krylia Sovetov Samara players
PFC Levski Sofia players
PFC CSKA Moscow players
FC Moscow players
FC Khimki players
FC Lada-Tolyatti players
Russian expatriate sportspeople in Bulgaria
Russian Premier League players
First Professional Football League (Bulgaria) players
FC Volga Nizhny Novgorod players
FC Gornyak Uchaly players
FC Oryol players
Association football midfielders
FC Saturn Ramenskoye players